Richard Wallace (22 March 1934 – 3 July 2019) was an Australian cricketer. He played one first-class match for Tasmania in 1960/61.

See also
 List of Tasmanian representative cricketers

References

External links
 

1934 births
2019 deaths
Australian cricketers
Tasmania cricketers
Cricketers from Melbourne